Manfred Kokot (born 3 January 1948 in Templin, Brandenburg) is a former East German athlete, who won the silver medal in the 4 × 100 m relay at the 1976 Summer Olympics in Montreal, Quebec, Canada. He did so alongside Jörg Pfeifer, Klaus-Dieter Kurrat and Alexander Thieme. In 1977, his team came in second place in the 4 x 100 m relay at the IAAF World Cup in Düsseldorf.

In 1971 Kokot became a co-holder of the European 100 m record with 10.0 seconds, and in 1973 he set the world record in 50 metres indoor sprint at 5.61 seconds.

References

1948 births
Living people
People from Templin
East German male sprinters
Sportspeople from Brandenburg
Olympic athletes of East Germany
Athletes (track and field) at the 1972 Summer Olympics
Athletes (track and field) at the 1976 Summer Olympics
Olympic silver medalists for East Germany
European Athletics Championships medalists
Medalists at the 1976 Summer Olympics
Olympic silver medalists in athletics (track and field)
Recipients of the Patriotic Order of Merit in bronze